The Austrolithoideae are a subfamily of coralline algae.

References

Corallinaceae